Qasim Oryakhail (born 10 January 1992) is an Afghan cricketer. He made his Twenty20 debut for Band-e-Amir Dragons in the 2017 Shpageeza Cricket League on 12 September 2017. He made his first-class debut for Speen Ghar Region in the 2017–18 Ahmad Shah Abdali 4-day Tournament on 20 October 2017. He made his List A debut for Kabul Region in the 2018 Ghazi Amanullah Khan Regional One Day Tournament on 15 July 2018.

References

External links
 

1992 births
Living people
Afghan cricketers
Place of birth missing (living people)
Band-e-Amir Dragons cricketers
Kabul Eagles cricketers
Spin Ghar Tigers cricketers
Wicket-keepers